Germano Borovicz Cardozo Schweger or simply Germano (born 21 March 1981), is a retired Brazilian footballer who played as a defensive midfielder.

Biography

Londrina and loans
Born in Toledo, Paraná, Germano had played for Grêmio Maringá and Toledo Esporte Clube before joined Londrina. he played for Cascavel in 2002 season and won promotion to Campeonato Paranaense as Campeonato Paranaense 2ª Divisão third place. After Londrina failed to qualify to the final round of 2004 Campeonato Brasileiro Série B, he was loaned to Gama and made his debut on 2 October 2004 as substitute. The team finished as the runner-up of 2004 Campeonato Brasileiro Série C and promoted.

He then signed a contract with Londrina's affiliated club Londrina Junior Team (later became an independent team) and loaned to Ceará. The loan was extended in April. He played 16 games in 2005 Campeonato Brasileiro Série B; the team finished as the 11th, failed to qualify for the final stage. In September, he was loaned to São Caetano of Campeonato Brasileiro Série A. His contract with São Caetano was renewed in January 2006. He extended his contract with Londrina Junior in May 2006. and he was loaned to Vila Nova in September. He scored a debut goal on 9 September (round 22), an equalizing goal against Ituano; eventually the match end in 1–1 draw. The team as the bottom of 2006 Campeonato Brasileiro Série B and relegated.

In January 2007 he extended his contract with Londrina Junior again and loaned to Atlético Mineiro.

Oerezo Osaka
In August, he was loaned to J2 League club Cerezo Osaka. In January 2008 he was signed in permanent deal.

Santos
In January 2009 he returned to Brazil and signed a 1-year deal with Santos FC. In January 2010 he extended his contract until 30 May 2011.

Sport Recife
On 19 May 2010 he was signed by Sport Recife on a -year contract.

Retirement
At the end of November 2019, 38-year-old Germano announced his retirement. Shortly after, he was hired as a director for Londrina, where he was going to be the link between the football department and the management, and also be involved in player sales as well as purchases.

Club statistics

Honours
Atlético Mineiro
Minas Gerais State League: 2007

Santos
São Paulo State League: 2010

 Londrina
Primeira Liga: 2017

References

External links
 
 
 Futpedia 

Brazilian footballers
Campeonato Brasileiro Série A players
Campeonato Brasileiro Série B players
Campeonato Brasileiro Série C players
Campeonato Brasileiro Série D players
J2 League players
Londrina Esporte Clube players
Sociedade Esportiva do Gama players
Ceará Sporting Club players
Associação Desportiva São Caetano players
Vila Nova Futebol Clube players
Clube Atlético Mineiro players
Cerezo Osaka players
Santos FC players
Sport Club do Recife players
Coritiba Foot Ball Club players
Association football midfielders
Brazilian expatriate footballers
Expatriate footballers in Japan
Brazilian expatriate sportspeople in Japan
People from Toledo, Paraná
1981 births
Living people
Sportspeople from Paraná (state)